Boismorand is a commune in the Loiret department in the Centre-Val de Loire region in central-north France. In 2019, it had a population of 840.

Demographics

See also
Communes of the Loiret department

References

Communes of Loiret